Three Forks is an unincorporated community in Warren County, Kentucky, United States.

References

Unincorporated communities in Warren County, Kentucky
Unincorporated communities in Kentucky